The men's singles tennis competition was one of five tennis events at the 1924 Summer Olympics. There were 82 competitors from 27 nations. Nations were limited to four players each, as they had been in 1920. The event was won by Vincent Richards of the United States, the nation's first victory in the event since 1904 and second overall (tied with South Africa for second-most all-time behind Great Britain's three wins). France and Italy each earned their first men's singles tennis medals, with Henri Cochet's silver and Uberto De Morpurgo's bronze, respectively.

Background

This was the seventh appearance of the men's singles tennis event. The event has been held at every Summer Olympics where tennis has been on the program: from 1896 to 1924 and then from 1988 to the current program. Demonstration events were held in 1968 and 1984.

The field for this event was stronger than previous Olympic tournaments, but still had significant absences. The American greats Bill Tilden and Bill Johnston ("Big Bill" and "Little Bill") did not compete, but Vincent Richards was ranked world #2 in 1924 and the rest of the United States team (R. Norris Williams, Watson Washburn, and Francis Hunter) were all significant players. Three of France's Four Musketeers, who would rise to prominence later in the 1920s, competed. Defending champion Louis Raymond of South Africa returned.

Argentina, Chile, Finland, India, Ireland, Luxembourg, Mexico, Portugal, Romania, and Yugoslavia each made their debut in the event. France made its sixth appearance, most among all nations, having missed only the 1904 event.

Competition format

The competition was a single-elimination tournament with a bronze-medal match. All matches were best-of-five sets.

Schedule

Draw

Finals

Top half

Section 1

Section 2

Section 3

Section 4

Bottom half

Section 5

Section 6

Section 7

Section 8

Results summary

References

Sources
 ITF, 2008 Olympic Tennis Event Media Guide

Men's singles
Men's events at the 1924 Summer Olympics